Aaron Provincial Park is a park in Kenora District, Ontario, Canada, located  east of the community of Dryden. It can be accessed via Ontario Highway 17.  Aaron Provincial Park is located on the east end of Thunder Lake.

References

External links
Official Park Website

Provincial parks of Ontario
Parks in Kenora District
Year of establishment missing